Malusha Malkovna was allegedly a servant (kholopka) for Olga of Kiev and concubine of Sviatoslav I of Kiev. According to Slavonic chronicles, she was the mother of Vladimir the Great and sister of Dobrynya. The Norse sagas describe Vladimir's mother as a prophetess who lived to the age of 100 and was brought from her cave to the palace to predict the future. There are monuments of Malusha with her young son, Vladimir, in Korosten, Ukraine.

Origin
As the chronicles are silent on the subject of Malusha's pedigree, 19th-century Russian and Ukrainian historians devised various theories to explain her parentage and name.

Malusha Malkovna is said to be the daughter of Malk of Lyubech, prince of the Drevlians. The same one that wanted to marry Olga of Kiev after she became a widow. However, historian Leo Loewenson rebutted that Malk was not Drevlian nor a prince, pointing out that the Primary Chronicle only mentions his name as 'Malk Lyubechinin' or 'Malk of Lyubech' and that there "there is not the faintest indication that Malyusha's father was a prince". Loewenson further notes that Lyubech "was a town of the Severians not the Drevlians". Soviet-Israeli historian Savely Dudakov stated that due to having a Jewish name and with Lyubech being a part of pre-Christian Rus at the time, Malk should be considered either a Jew or a Khazar-Judaist in the historical context.

Primary Chronicle records that a certain Malusha died in 1000. This record follows that of Rogneda's death. Since Rogneda was Vladimir's wife, historians assume that Malusha was another close relative of the ruling prince, preferably his wife or mother.

The anti-Normanist historian Dmitry Ilovaisky managed to draw an opposite conclusion: that the Slavic name Malusha was turned into a Scandinavian Malfried. This claim received no wider support.

References

10th-century women
Prophets
Kievan Rus' princesses
Concubines
10th-century Rus' people
10th-century Rus' women